Rasmi Jinan (born 6 April 1981) is a Sri Lankan former cricketer. He played in 50 first-class and 42 List A matches between 2000/01 and 2012/13. He made his Twenty20 debut on 17 August 2004, for Sri Lanka Police Sports Club in the 2004 SLC Twenty20 Tournament.

References

External links
 

1981 births
Living people
Sri Lankan cricketers
Bloomfield Cricket and Athletic Club cricketers
Sri Lanka Police Sports Club cricketers
Place of birth missing (living people)